Ground squirrels are members of the squirrel family of rodents (Sciuridae), which generally live on or in the ground, rather than trees. The term is most often used for the medium-sized ground squirrels, as the larger ones are more commonly known as marmots (genus Marmota) or prairie dogs, while the smaller and less bushy-tailed ground squirrels tend to be known as chipmunks (genus Tamias). Together, they make up the "marmot tribe" of squirrels, Marmotini, a division within the large and mainly ground squirrel subfamily Xerinae, and containing six living genera. Well-known members of this largely Holarctic group are the marmots (Marmota), including the American groundhog, the chipmunks, the susliks (Spermophilus), and the prairie dogs (Cynomys). They are highly variable in size and habitus, but most are remarkably able to rise up on their hind legs and stand fully erect comfortably for prolonged periods. They also tend to be far more gregarious than other squirrels, and many live in colonies with complex social structures. Most Marmotini are rather short-tailed and large squirrels.

The chipmunks of the genus Tamias frequently spend time in trees. Also closer to typical squirrels in other aspects, they are occasionally considered a tribe of their own (Tamiini).

The ground squirrel is especially renowned for its tendency to rise up on its hind legs, usually whenever it senses nearby danger, or when it must see over tall grasses. The squirrel then curls its paws flat against its chest and sends a screeching call to warn other family members about the presence of predators.

Evolution and systematics

Palaeosciurus from Europe is the oldest known ground squirrel species, and it does not seem to be particularly close to any of the two to three living lineages (subtribes) of Marmotini. The oldest fossils are from the Early Oligocene, more than 30 million years ago (Mya), but the genus probably persisted at least until the mid-Miocene, some 15 Mya.

Where the Marmotini originated is unclear. The subtribes probably diverged in the early to mid-Oligocene, as primitive marmots and chipmunks are known from the Late Oligocene of North America. The fossil record of the "true" ground squirrels is less well known, beginning only in the mid-Miocene, when modern susliks and prairie dogs are known to have inhabited their present-day range already.

Whether the Marmotini dispersed between North America and Eurasia via "island-hopping" across the Bering Straits or the Greenland region—both of which were temperate habitat at that time—and from which continent they dispersed to which, or if both continents brought forth distinct subtribes which then spread to the other, is not known and would probably require more fossil material to be resolved. In any case, the fairly comprehensive fossil record of Europe—at the relevant time separated from Asia by the Turgai Sea—lacks ancient Marmotini except the indeterminate Palaeosciurus, which might be taken to indicate an East Asian or western North American origin with trans-Beringia dispersal being the slightly more satisfying hypothesis. This is also supported by the enigmatic Chinese genus Sciurotamias, which may be the most ancient living lineage of this group, or—if the chipmunks are not included here—close to the common ancestor of the Tamiini and the Marmotini sensu stricto.

In any case, expansion of the Marmotini to Africa was probably prevented by competitive exclusion by their close relatives the Protoxerini and Xerini—the native terrestrial and palm squirrels of that continent, which must have evolved at the same time as the Marmotini did.

Size 

Habitat 
Open areas including rocky outcrops, fields, pastures, and sparsely wooded hillsides comprise their habitat. Ground squirrels also live in grassy areas such as pastures, golf courses, cemeteries, and parks.

Diet 
Ground squirrels are omnivorous, and not only eat a diet rich in fungi, nuts, fruits, and seeds, but also occasionally eat insects, eggs, and other small animals. They are known to eat rats and mice several times their size.

Subtribes and genera

Basal and incertae sedis genera
 Palaeosciurus (fossil)
 Callospermophilus 
 Notocitellus
 Otospermophilus (American rock squirrels)
 Poliocitellus (Franklin's ground squirrel)
 Sciurotamias (Chinese rock squirrels)
 Urocitellus
 Xerospermophilus
Subtribe Tamiina: chipmunks (might be full tribe)
 Eutamias
 Neotamias
 Nototamias (fossil)
 Tamias
Subtribe Marmotina: marmots and prairie dogs
 Arctomyoides (fossil)
 Miospermophilus (fossil)
 Paenemarmota (fossil)
 Palaearctomys (fossil)
 Protospermophilus (fossil)
 Marmota
 Cynomys (prairie dogs)
Subtribe Spermophilina: true ground squirrels
 Spermophilinus (fossil)
 Ammospermophilus
 Ictidomys: Thirteen-lined ground squirrel and related species
 Spermophilus

Cladogram

Below is a cladogram of ground squirrels (tribe Marmotini) derived from maximum parsimony analysis.

See also
Xerini - the related "ground squirrels" of Asia and Africa
Tree squirrel

References

Further reading
 
  (2004): "Nuclear DNA phylogeny of the squirrels (Mammalia: Rodentia) and the evolution of arboreality from c-myc and RAG1". Mol. Phyl. Evol. 30(3): 703–719.  PDF fulltext
  (2005): Family Sciuridae. In: Mammal Species of the World—A Taxonomic and Geographic Reference: 754–818. Johns Hopkins University Press, Baltimore.

External links

 About California Ground Squirrels

 01
Mammals of Asia
Mammals of North America
Extant Rupelian first appearances
Taxa named by R. I. Pocock